Benjamin William Quarteyquaye Quartey-Papafio,  (25 June 1859 – 14 September 1924) was a physician pioneer and politician on the Gold Coast - the first Ghanaian to obtain the medical degree (M.D) and the first to practise as an orthodox-trained physician.

Life
Benjamin Quartey-Papafio was born into a leading Accra family: his parents were Akwashotse  Chief William Quartey-Papafio, also known as Nii Kwatei-Kojo or "Old Papafio", and Momo Omedru, a businesswoman from Gbese (Dutch Accra) and Amanokrom Akuapem.

Quartey-Papafio was educated at the CMS Grammar School and Fourah Bay College in Freetown, Sierra Leone, before travelling to study in Britain. Gaining a B.A. degree from Durham University, he enrolled as a medical student at St Bartholomew's Hospital Medical College in 1882 before shortly relocating to Edinburgh University. He graduated from Edinburgh with the degree M.B. and M.Ch. in 1886 and became a member of the Royal College of Surgeons. In 1896, he earned a postgraduate research medical doctorate (MD) from Edinburgh after completing a dissertation titled, "Malarial haemoglobinuric fever, (so-called) Blackwater Fever of the Gold coast: chiefly from a clinico-pathological standpoint, with illustrative cases."

His brother, Emmanuel William Kwate Quartey-Papafio (1857–1928) was an agriculturist and a trader. Another brother, Arthur Boi Quartey-Papafio (1869–1927) studied at Accra's Wesleyan High School, then to Fourah Bay College before reading law at Christ College, Cambridge and in 1897, he was called to the Bar at Lincoln's Inn, London. He opened his own chambers in Accra and wrote extensively on the history of Accra and customary laws of the Ga people. From 1905 to 1909, he was a member of the Accra Town Council and the co-founding treasurer of the National Congress of British West Africa. He also co-edited the newspaper, the Gold Coast Advocate. Two other members of the Quartey-Papafio family, Clement W. Quartey-Papafio (1882–1938) and Hugh Quartey-Papafio  (1890–1959) (children of Emmanuel William Kwate Quartey-Papafio) also became barristers and were active in Accra high society.

He was the first African to receive a medical degree in the Gold Coast

Returning to the Gold Coast, he was a medical officer for the Gold Coast Government Service from 1888 until 1905, and was also in private practice. Quartey-Papafio had three children by Hannah Maria Ekua Duncan, of a Cape Coast/Elmina family; on 8 October 1896 at St Bartholomew-the-Great Church in Smithfield, London, he married Eliza Sabina Meyer, daughter of Richard Meyer of Accra, and the couple had six children.

A member of the Accra Town Council from 1909 to 1912, Quartey-Papafio was a member of the 1911 deputation to London that protested the Forest Bill. He was an unofficial member of the Legislative Council from 1919 to 1924. He was a practising Anglican.

Family
Quartey-Papafio's son and five daughters were educated in Britain: Mercy (Ffoulkes-Crabbe), Ruby (Quartey-Papafio) and Grace (Nelson) became teachers in the Gold Coast. His son, Percy, trained as a doctor but was unable to practise due to failing eyesight caused by cataracts. Dr B. W. Quartey-Papafio, Nene Sir Emmanuel Mate Kole, KBE (Konor of Manya Krobo), Dr F. V. Nanka-Bruce, Hon. Sir Thomas Hutton-Mills, along with Nana Sir Ofori Atta (Omanhene of Akim Abuakwa), Nana Amonoo, F. J. P. Brown of Cape Coast, J. Ephraim Casely-Hayford of Sekondi were architects of founding of Achimota College. Dr Ruby directed her efforts and passion into being an economist and an accomplished Headmistress at Accra Girls High School. In addition to ghost-writing and being of great assistance to the late Kwame Nkrumah and his cohorts/co-nationalists actualization of Ghana's independence, Mercy's pacesetting genes also resulted in her being appointed as the first Ghanaian headmistress at Cape Coast Government Girls School. After achieving highly accredited fellowship of the Royal College of Surgeons, her only child Nana Ffoulkes Crabbe-Johnson continued the distinctions of leadership by being the first Ghanaian Professor and Head of Department in Anaesthesiology (Lagos University Teaching Hospital)in a foreign medical institution and female President of the West African College of Surgeons.

References

1924 deaths
Ghanaian politicians
Medical doctors from Accra
Ga-Adangbe people
Ghanaian Anglicans
Ghanaian Protestants
Fourah Bay College alumni
Alumni of the University of Edinburgh
Alumni of the University of Edinburgh Medical School
1859 births